The South London Electric Supply Corporation Limited was a British electricity undertaking. It was established in 1896 to supply electricity to the parish/borough of Lambeth in south London. The Corporation owned and operated a power station at Loughborough Junction. From 1925 it formed an association with three other London companies to centralise electricity generation in the new, high thermal efficiency, power station at Barking. The South London Electric  Corporation was abolished in March 1948 upon the nationalisation of the British electricity supply industry.

Background 
The South London Electric Supply Corporation Limited was registered on 4 December 1896 and took over the electricity supply interests of the Lambeth Vestry (later the Metropolitan Borough of Lambeth) in 1897. The Vestry had been granted a Provisional Order by the Board of Trade to supply electricity to the parish of Lambeth in 1892. This was confirmed by Parliament in the Electric Lighting Orders Confirmation (No.6) Act 1892. The supply area was all the Lambeth Vestry/Metropolitan Borough except small parts in the north and south and the detached part of the parish of Streatham.

The Corporation had an authorised capital of £325,000 comprising 65,000 shares of £5 each, there were 594 shareholders in 1898. The Corporation built a power station in Bengeworth Road Loughborough Junction (51°27'59"N 0°05'48"W) in the Borough of Lambeth together with a high voltage distribution cable network. Part of the agreement with the Vestry was that the Corporation would burn dustbin refuse receiving 11½d. per ton destroyed and would provide current for 25 street lights free of charge. Electricity supply started in November 1899.

Operations

Management Board 
The management board of the South London Electric Supply Corporation in 1898 comprised:

 G. Ellis
 B. Fitch
 E. Ironside Bax
 Algenon Turnor
 W. W. Phipps

The company offices were at Bengeworth Road, Loughborough Junction, London.

Power station 
In 1923 the plant at Loughborough Junction comprised:

 Boilers:
 Coal fired boilers producing 130,000 lb/h (16.4 kg/s) of steam which supplied:
 Generators:
 1 × 250 kW reciprocating engine, alternating current,
 1 × 500 kW reciprocating engine, alternating current,
 1 × 800 kW reciprocating engine, alternating current,
 1 × 900 kW reciprocating engine, alternating current,
 1 × 900 kW reciprocating engine, alternating current,
 1 × 1,500 kW turbo-alternator, alternating current,
 1 × 2,500 kW turbo-alternator, alternating current, 

These machines had a total generating capacity of 7,350 kW.

The power station had a single chimney.

The electricity available to customers was:

 2-phase AC 50 Hz, at 220 Volts
 1-phase AC 50 Hz, at 220 Volts.

Operational data 
The following table summarises the growth of the Corporation in terms of capacity of the plant, the electricity load, the amount of current sold, and the number of customers.

The growth in sales of electricity in MWh is shown in the following graphs. The dust destructor was decommissioned in 1900 as fumes caused a local nuisance.

Electricity use 
Electricity was originally used for lighting but ‘power’ uses were soon established. The following table illustrates the changing patterns of use.

Financial statistics 
The capital required to establish, build and operate the business was raised through the offer of shares. Capital expenditure was needed for the purchase of land, buildings, machinery, mains, transformers, meters, electrical instruments, legal costs, fixtures and furniture at the stations.

The South London Corporation current account revenue was as follows.

Share offers were made on several occasions throughout the operating life of the corporation. For example, in 1908 an issue of £100,000 five per cent shares were offered.

The overall revenue, expenses and profit for the South London Electric Supply Corporation were as shown. 

To meet the requirement of increased demand, capital expenditure on new plant and equipment was required, as shown on the table below.

Dividends to shareholders were paid throughout the operational life of the company. Dividends as a percentage of the total capital raised in a given year were as shown, together with the average dividends paid by the London company electricity undertakings.

Joint working 
The South London Corporation and three other companies in south and east London promoted the London Electricity (No.1) Act 1925. The four companies were: the City of London Electric Lighting Company; the County of London Electric Supply Company Limited; the South London Electric Supply Corporation Limited; and the South Metropolitan Electric Light and Power Company Limited. They established a joint committee to specify how generating stations of each company were operated. The companies remained district electricity supply undertakings; although they were physically joined with interconnecting cables. The companies envisaged that power stations such as Barking would provide enough capacity for their electricity requirements. The Act required equal consideration for the interests of shareholders and consumers. Dividends to shareholders were limited to 7 percent per year and the funds that could be carried forward in the accounts were restricted. Profits above these conditions formed a ‘consumers’ benefit’ in the form of lower prices.

The County of London Company built the 118.75 MW Barking A power station which was commissioned in 1925. This was followed by the 303.5 MW Barking B commissioned from 1933.

Under the terms of the Electricity (Supply) Act 1926 (16-17 Geo. 5 c. 51) the Central Electricity Board (CEB) was established. The CEB identified high efficiency ‘selected’ power stations that would supply electricity most effectively. The CEB also constructed the national grid (1927–33) to connect power stations within a region.

These interconnections and those provided by the national grid enabled the bulk transfer of electricity. In 1929 the South London Corporation decommissioned the Bengeworth Road power station and purchased its electricity needs (38,593 MWh in 1931) from the Central Electricity Board).

Nationlisation 
The British electricity supply industry was nationalised in 1948 under the provisions of the Electricity Act 1947 (10-11 Geo. 6 c. 54). The South London Electric Supply Corporation undertaking was abolished, ownership of bulk supply substations and transmission were vested in the British Electricity Authority, and subsequently the Central Electricity Authority and the Central Electricity Generating Board (CEGB). At the same time the electricity distribution and sales responsibilities of the South London Electric Supply Corporation electricity undertaking were transferred to the London Electricity Board (LEB).

See also 

 Timeline of the UK electricity supply industry
 London Power Company
 City of London Electric Lighting Company
 County of London Electric Supply Company
 South Metropolitan Electric Light and Power Company
 Charing Cross and Strand Electricity Supply Corporation

References 

Defunct electric power companies of the United Kingdom
Electric power companies of England
Electric power infrastructure in England
Energy companies disestablished in 1948